"Echoes of Love" is a song by the American rock band The Doobie Brothers. The song was written by band member Patrick Simmons in collaboration with Willie Mitchell and Earl Randle. This song served as the second single from their seventh studio album Livin' on the Fault Line. The song was also covered by The Pointer Sisters on their 1978 album Energy.

Cash Box said that "an unusual, synthesized introduction instantly lends a warm feeling" and that it contains "deep layers of vocal harmony."  Record World said that the song "emphasizes synthesizer work and vocal harmonies, and bears [the Doobie Brothers'] melodic trademarks."

Personnel
Patrick Simmons – lead vocals, guitar
Michael McDonald – backing vocals, keyboards, synthesizer
Jeff Baxter – guitar
Tiran Porter – backing vocals, bass
Keith Knudsen – backing vocals, drums
John Hartman – drums

Additional Personnel
Bobby LaKind – backing vocals, congas
Ted Templeman – percussion

Charts

References

1977 singles
The Doobie Brothers songs
1977 songs
Songs written by Willie Mitchell (musician)
Songs written by Patrick Simmons